Justin Foley is an American musician, best known as the drummer of the metalcore band, Killswitch Engage. He is also a former member of the band Blood Has Been Shed along with Killswitch Engage's former lead singer, Howard Jones.

Biography

Early life
Foley is a classically trained percussionist who attended the University of Connecticut for his bachelor's degree and the University of Hartford's Hartt School for his master's degree. 

Before joining Killswitch Engage, Foley participated in a Connecticut thrash/jazz metal band called Red Tide.  Red Tide began as a thrash metal outfit in 1993 then evolved into a jazz metal band in the late 1990s.  As the primary lyricist and one of the songwriters for Red Tide, Foley earned local celebrityhood.  With Red Tide, Foley released at least 5 demo tapes and two CDs.  Red Tide disbanded in 2002 as there was a general lack of interest in continuing (cited by interview).

Killswitch Engage 
Foley joined Killswitch Engage after the departure of the previous drummer, Tom Gomes, in October 2003. Foley has played drums on six albums with Killswitch Engage, to date.

Foley is one of the many advertising artists for Evans Drumheads, Yamaha Drums, and Zildjian Cymbals.

Guest percussion 
Foley also plays drums on metalcore band Unearth's 2011 album, Darkness in the Light filling in for departed drummer Derek Kerswill.

Lybica 
Foley started Lybica, a four-piece instrumental post-rock/metal band, in 2020. His primary role is guitarist, but he played both guitar and drums on their self-titled album, which was released on September 16, 2022. Lybica is signed with Metalblade Records.

Personal 
Foley has been quoted as saying that if he did not play drums, he would like to try out for the New York Yankees, of whom he is an avid fan.  He is also a Simpsons fanatic. Foley is known for his love of cats, a major inspiration for the band Lybica, where Foley plays guitar.

Discography

Red Tide

Themes of the Cosmic Consciousness (1997)
Type II (2001)

Blood Has Been Shed
Spirals (March 11, 2003; Ferret Records)

Killswitch Engage

The End of Heartache (May 11, 2004; Roadrunner Records)
As Daylight Dies (November 21, 2006; Roadrunner Records)
Killswitch Engage (June 30, 2009; Roadrunner Records)
Disarm The Descent (April 1, 2013; Roadrunner Records)
Incarnate (March 11, 2016; Roadrunner Records)
Atonement (August 16, 2019; Metal Blade Records)

Lybica, drums and guitar
Lybica (September 16, 2022; Metal Blade Records)

As a guest
Unearth - Darkness in the Light (July 4, 2011; Metal Blade Records)

References

External links

 https://zildjian.com/artists/justin-foley

American heavy metal drummers
1976 births
Living people
People from Simsbury, Connecticut
University of Connecticut alumni
University of Hartford Hartt School alumni
Musicians from Connecticut
Killswitch Engage members
20th-century American drummers
American male drummers
Blood Has Been Shed members
21st-century American drummers
20th-century American male musicians
21st-century American male musicians